This is the discography of American hip hop musician Fat Trel.

Mixtapes

Singles

Guest appearances

References 

Discographies of American artists
Hip hop discographies